Year 999 (CMXCIX) was a common year starting on Sunday (link will display the full calendar) of the Julian calendar.

Events 
 By place and name 

 Japan 
 9 February: The Mogi Ceremony of Fujiwara no Shoshi is held (she later becomes empress).
 December: Empress Teishi gives birth to Prince Atsuyasu (who becomes the imperial heir), but on the next day, her rival, Fujiwara no Shoshi, is promoted to Consort.

 Europe 
 King Bermudo II abdicates in favor of his 5-year-old son Alfonso V as ruler of León. Moorish invaders have forced Bermudo to recognize the suzerainty of their leader, Umayyad vizier and the de facto ruler Al-Mansur.
 9 September (999 or 1000) – Battle of Svolder: A Norwegian fleet, commanded by Olaf Tryggvason, is defeated by the combined fleet of the Danish king Sweyn Forkbeard and his Swedish counterpart Olaf the Swede, resulting in Tryggvason's death, and the splitting up of Norway between Sweden and Denmark.

 Ireland 
 December 30 - Battle of Glenmama: The combined forces of Munster and Meath under Brian Boru (High King of Ireland) inflict a crushing defeat on the allied armies of Leinster and Dublin near Lyons Hill (County Kildare).

  Central Asia 

 The Karakhanids invade from north of the Syr Darya River, ending the Samanid Empire (modern Iran). The Samanid domains are split between the Ghaznavid Dynasty and the Karakhanids.

 By topic 

 Religion 
 February 18 – Pope Gregory V dies after a 3-year pontificate in which the Crescentii family forced him to flee Rome. He is succeeded by Sylvester II as the 139th pope of the Catholic Church.
 Bishop Aldhun consecrates a cathedral (later Durham Cathedral), at a site where the remains of St. Cuthbert had been moved to in AD 995 from Lindisfarne because of the danger of Viking raids. 
 Sigmundur Brestisson, a Viking chieftain, introduces Christianity in the Faroe Islands.

Births 
 March 5 – Bao Zheng, politician of the Song Dynasty (d. 1062)
 Berengar of Tours, French theologian (approximate date) (d. 1088)
 Fujiwara no Ishi, Japanese empress consort (d. 1036)
 Odo of Rennes, duke and regent of Brittany (d. 1079)

Deaths 
 February 7 – Boleslaus II (the Pious), duke of Bohemia
 February 18 – Gregory V, pope of the Catholic Church (b. 972)
 June 11 – Ebergar (or Everger), archbishop of Cologne
 November 4 – Gregor von Burtscheid, German abbot
 November 29 – Li Chun'an, Chinese merchant (b. 921)
 December 16 – Adelaide, empress regent of the Holy Roman Empire (b. 931)
 Alfred of Malmesbury (or Aelfric), English abbot and writer 
 Cao Bin, Chinese general and governor (jiedushi) (b. 931)
 Ceallach ua Maílcorgus, Irish chief poet of Connacht
 Maredudd ab Owain, king of Gwynedd (Wales) (approximate date)
 Matilda, German princess-abbess and daughter of Otto I (b. 955) 
 Muirgheas mac Aedh, king of Uí Díarmata (Ireland)
 Subh of Córdoba, mother and regent of Hisham II
 Yelü Xiezhen, Chinese general and politician

References